This is a list of former Malaysian federal electoral districts by electorate (registered voters).

Electorate by year

2022

2018

2004

2008

2013

1986

1990

1995

1999

1974

1978

1982

1955

1959

1964

1969

References

External links
 https://web.archive.org/web/20111219150226/http://www2.pmo.gov.my/election/pemilih.asp

See also
 List of Malaysian electoral districts
 List of former Malaysian federal electoral districts
 List of Malayan federal electoral districts 1955–59

Elections in Malaysia
Lists of former constituencies
 
Malaysia politics-related lists